Keith Remfry (17 November 1947 – 16 September 2015) was a judoka from the United Kingdom, who won the silver medal in the Open Class at the 1976 Summer Olympics in Montreal, Quebec, Canada. He lost to Japan's Haruki Uemura, the reigning world openweight champion, in the final of the Olympic tournament.

Remfry died at the age of 67, on 16 September 2015, following a series of prolonged illnesses.

Notes

References

1947 births
2015 deaths
British male judoka
Olympic judoka of Great Britain
Olympic silver medallists for Great Britain
Judoka at the 1972 Summer Olympics
Judoka at the 1976 Summer Olympics
Olympic medalists in judo
Medalists at the 1976 Summer Olympics
20th-century British people
21st-century British people